Tom Ross (born 29 April 1998) is an Australian rugby union player who plays for the Brumbies in Super Rugby. His playing position is tighthead prop. He has signed for the Brumbies squad in 2019.

Ross also represented Australia under 20 at the 2018 Oceania u20s Championship and the 2018 World u20s Championship, where he was "one of the Wallabies most impressive performers in the tournament". He was educated at Canberra's Daramalan College, and represented ACT u17s in 2015, captaining the side to victory in the 2015 Gold Cup final.

Reference list

External links
Australian u20s profile

1998 births
Australian rugby union players
Living people
Rugby union props
Canberra Vikings players
ACT Brumbies players
Southland rugby union players
Rugby union players from Canberra